The Perth Martyrs were six people executed in Perth, Scotland in 1543 for their Protestant beliefs. The condemned people were William Anderson, James Finlayson, James Hunter, Robert Lamb, James Raveleson and Helen Stark. They were sentenced to death for their beliefs, after being convicted by the Archbishop of St Andrews. Anderson, Finlayson, Hunter and Lamb were sentenced to be hanged, Raveleson was to be burnt; and Helen Stark, "with her sucking infant", was to be put into a sack and drowned. Their story is recorded in Foxe's Book of Martyrs, in Calderwood's History of the Kirk of Scotland  and in James Anthony Froude's History of England.

See also
List of Protestant martyrs of the Scottish Reformation

References

1543 deaths
16th-century Protestant martyrs
People executed for heresy
People from Perth, Scotland
Groups of Christian martyrs of the Early Modern era
Year of birth unknown
Protestant martyrs of Scotland